Glen Howard Sturtevant Jr. (born September 14, 1982) is an American lawyer and Republican politician, who served as a member of the Senate of Virginia (a part-time position) from 2016 to 2020. His Virginia Senate committee assignments included Commerce and Labor, Courts of Justice, General Laws and Technology, and Local Government.

Born in Wilmington, Delaware, Sturtevant grew up in Spotsylvania and Chesterfield Counties, graduating from Midlothian High School. He then attended Catholic University in Washington, D.C. and received a B.A. degree. He later attended what was then called George Mason Law School (now Antonin Scalia Law School) in Arlington, Virginia and received a J.D. degree.

Sturtevant is a member of and active in the Virginia State Bar. He practices with the Rawls Law Group, concentrating on complex civil litigation, including medical malpractice. From 2012 until his election to the state senate, Sturtevant served on the Richmond School Board.

Electoral history

2015 election

2019 election 
{| class="wikitable"
|-
! Date !! Election !! Candidate !! Party !! Votes !! %
|-
! colspan="6" | Virginia Senate, 10th district
|-
! rowspan="6" | November 5, 2019
| rowspan="6" align="center" | General
| Glen H. Sturtevant Jr.
|  | Republican
| align="right" | 36,811
| align="right" | 45.60
|-
| Ghazala Hashmi
|  | Democratic
| align="right" | 43,806
| align="right" | 54.30
|-
|-
| colspan="2" | Write Ins
| align="right" | 49
| align="right" | 0.01
|-

References

External links
 
 
Official legislative website

1982 births
Living people
Republican Party Virginia state senators
Catholic University of America alumni
Antonin Scalia Law School alumni
21st-century American politicians
People from Wilmington, Delaware
Politicians from Richmond, Virginia
School board members in Virginia
Lawyers from Richmond, Virginia